The UFC Performance Institute is the official mixed martial arts (MMA) facility for American 
promotion Ultimate Fighting Championship (UFC). The building is located in Enterprise, Nevada opposite the UFC Apex, and serves as the company headquarters.

History 
The institute was opened in May 2017, and is the world's first mixed martial arts center for innovation, research and training.

As many as 400 MMA athletes have visited the center, as well as NFL, NBA, NHL and MLB athletes.

In June 2019, a second facility was opened in Shanghai, China. The official name of the facility is UFC Performance Institute Shanghai. It has been used to train athletes from China for the Olympic games.

Two new facilities are proposed for Mexico and Nigeria.

UFC Performance Institute Mexico will open in Q4 2023.

See also
 List of Top Professional MMA Training Camps
 UFC Apex
 Ultimate Fighting Championship

References 

Mixed martial arts training facilities
2017 establishments in Nevada
Ultimate Fighting Championship